Chaussy is a commune in the Loiret department in north-central France in the Centre-Val de Loire region.

See also
Communes of the Loiret department

References

Communes of Loiret